Dolymorpha is a genus of butterflies in the family Lycaenidae.

Lycaenidae
Lycaenidae genera